Frank S. Giles Jr. (born June 15, 1915, in Methuen, Massachusetts – died March 2, 1991, in Burlington, Massachusetts ) was a politician who was a Member of the Massachusetts House of Representatives and the Massachusetts Public Safety Commissioner.

Business career
Giles was a Theatre manager, and the proprietor of the Merrimack Concession Co.

Government service
Giles was a member of the Massachusetts House of Representatives from the 5th Essex District from 1947 to 1961. He was named House Minority Leader in 1957. Giles was also a Methuen town meeting member for 22 years and a member of the Methuen school committee for six years, five as chairman. In 1960, Giles ran for Governor of Massachusetts, he lost the convention nomination to John A. Volpe and did not run in the primary. Giles was appointed Massachusetts Public Safety Commissioner by Volpe on July 20, 1961.

Indictment and resignation
On March 26, 1964, Giles was indicted on charges of conspiracy, larceny, aiding and abetting in making false reports, and conflict of interest. As a result, on March 30, 1964, Giles was suspended from his job as Massachusetts Public Safety Commissioner. Robert McDonald was appointed acting commissioner on April 16, 1964, by Governor Endicott Peabody. On December 23, 1964, Peabody chose Richard Caples to succeed McDonald as Acting Public Safety Commissioner. Giles was found guilty of perjury on February 18, 1965. He resigned as Commissioner on September 27, 1965. His resignation was accepted by the Governor on September 28, 1965. As Giles suspension was terminated by his resignation, Caples temporary appointment also ended, and Leo L. Laughlin was appointed by Governor John A. Volpe to fill the vacancy that was created by Giles' resignation. Giles conviction was set aside on June 22, 1967.

See also
 Massachusetts legislature: 1947–1948, 1949–1950, 1951–1952, 1953–1954, 1955–1956

References

1915 births
1991 deaths
Republican Party members of the Massachusetts House of Representatives
People from Methuen, Massachusetts
20th-century American politicians